Love Songs for the Hearing Impaired is the debut solo album by Dan Baird, the former lead singer of the Georgia Satellites. It was released in 1992 on the Def American label, and was produced by Brendan O'Brien.

Track listing

Personnel 
Terry Anderson – background vocals
Dan Baird – guitar, primary artist, slide guitar, vocals
Shawn Berman – assistant engineer, engineer, mixing assistant
Pat Buchanan – background vocals
Keith Christopher – bass, primary artist
Tommy Cooper – engineer
George D. – organ
Nick "Danger" Didia – engineer
Russ Fowler – engineer
John Jackson – engineer, mixing assistant
Mauro Magellan – drums, primary artist
Gary McGachan – assistant engineer, engineer, mixing assistant
Norman Moore – design
Brendan O'Brien – engineer, guitar, mixing, organ, organ (Hammond), piano, primary artist, producer, background vocals
Rick Rubin – executive producer, producer
Benmont Tench – guest artist, piano
Howie Weinberg – mastering
Michael Wilson – photography

References 

1992 debut albums
Albums produced by Brendan O'Brien (record producer)
American Recordings (record label) albums